Alexander Popov (in Bulgarian: Александър Попов, born 9 june 1972 in Sofia) is former Bulgarian volleyball player, CEO and head coach of the men's team of VC CSKA Sofia from 1997.

References

External links
 Interview with A. Popov in GONG.BG 

1972 births
Living people
Bulgarian men's volleyball players
Bulgarian volleyball coaches